The  was an animal cruelty case involving the torture and death of a cat in Japan. The case was a significant development as Japanese animal abuse laws had previously been lax and seldom enforced.

On May 6 and May 7, 2002, an unemployed 26-year-old man from Kure, Hiroshima Prefecture, captured a kitten in his Fukuoka neighborhood and took it into his home. Matsubara tortured the cat for four hours by cutting off its ear and tail before strangling the cat with a piece of string. Matsubara hung the cat into a river. Matsubara took photographs of the torture and posted them onto 2channel. A placard seen in the final photograph reads in Japanese "Offer to the brothers of Kuromutsu in the world!! Oscar Dill". Kuromutsu generally refers to people that kill dogs and cats; it is used on 2ch to refer to the "I hate pets" subforum.

A poster discovered the pictures and contacted the appropriate authorities, who then proceeded to arrest Matsubara. Matsubara was sentenced on October 21, 2002 to six months' imprisonment, but the judge suspended the jail term because his privacy was violated due to the incident.

The cat who died was posthumously named "Kogenta" (こげんた) by a Buddhist priest.

See also 
 Animal welfare and rights in Japan

References

Further reading
"Internet Cat Torturer Gets Slap on the Wrist." Mainichi Shimbun
"Cat abuser faces jail." Mainichi Shimbun
"Prosecutors sharpen claws on notorious cat abuser." Mainichi Shimbun

External links
 2channel threads about the abuse (Japanese)
 The "Dear Kogenta" website made by a man campaigning to stop animal abuse
 Himawari's Site about the Kogenta abuse case

Animal cruelty incidents
2channel
Crime in Japan
Animal Cruelty Case, 2002
Animal welfare and rights in Japan